Capo di Vado Lighthouse is an active lighthouse located on the prominent Capo di Vado,  south of Vado Ligure, Liguria on the Ligurian Sea.

Description
The lighthouse is completely automated and operated by the Marina Militare with the identification code number 1514 E.F.

See also
 List of lighthouses in Italy
 Vado Ligure

References

External links
 Servizio Fari Marina Militare

Lighthouses in Italy
Lighthouses completed in 1883
1883 establishments in Italy
Buildings and structures in the Province of Savona